Vancouver-Fraserview is a provincial electoral district for the Legislative Assembly of British Columbia, Canada.

Geography 
Following the redistricting in 2015 based on the previous census, Vancouver-Fraserview sits in the southeastern portion of Vancouver, including the neighbourhoods of Sunset, Victoria-Fraserview, and Killarney.  Its approximate borders are East 49th Ave to the north, Fraser St to the west, Boundary Rd to the east, and the Fraser River to the south.

History 
The riding was created for the 1991 election out of parts of the dual member ridings of Vancouver South and Vancouver East.

Electoral history

Member of Legislative Assembly 

The current MLA of Vancouver-Fraserview is George Chow. Recent MLAs include Kash Heed, who served as the Minister of Public Safety and Solicitor General, and Suzanne Anton and Wally Oppal, who both served as the Attorney-General. Since its inception in 1991 until the 2020 re-election of George Chow, this district has never had an MLA that has served more than one term.

Election results 

|-

|- bgcolor="white"
!align="right" colspan=3|Total valid votes
!align="right"|21,649
!align="right"|100%
!align="right"|
|- bgcolor="white"
!align="right" colspan=3|Total rejected ballots
!align="right"|251
!align="right"|1.15
!align="right"|
|- bgcolor="white"
!align="right" colspan=3|Turnout
!align="right"|21,900
!align="right"|54.96%
!align="right"|
|}

|-

|- bgcolor="white"
!align="right" colspan=3|Total valid votes
!align="right"|19,372
!align="right"|100%
!align="right"|
|- bgcolor="white"
!align="right" colspan=3|Total rejected ballots
!align="right"|175
!align="right"|0.90%
!align="right"|
|- bgcolor="white"
!align="right" colspan=3|Turnout
!align="right"|19,547
!align="right"|51.09%
!align="right"|
|}

|-

|-
 
|NDP
|Ravinder Gill
|align="right"|8,783
|align="right"|42.43%
|align="right"|
|align="right"|$55,698

|- bgcolor="white"
!align="right" colspan=3|Total valid votes
!align="right"|20,702
!align="right"|100%
!align="right"|
|- bgcolor="white"
!align="right" colspan=3|Total rejected ballots
!align="right"|286
!align="right"|1.38%
!align="right"|
|- bgcolor="white"
!align="right" colspan=3|Turnout
!align="right"|20,988
!align="right"|57.96%
!align="right"|
|}

|-

|-
 
|NDP
|Ian Waddell
|align="right"|5,815
|align="right"|31.91%
|align="right"|
|align="right"|$28,396

|}

|-
 
|NDP
|Ian Waddell
|align="right"|8,774
|align="right"|45.97%
|align="right"|
|align="right"|$41,504

|-

|Natural Law
|Prince Pabbies
|align="right"|57
|align="right"|0.30%
|align="right"|
|align="right"|$139

|}

|-
 
|NDP
|Bernie Simpson
|align="right"|8,016
|align="right"|44.16%
|align="right"|
|align="right"|$43,735
|-

|}

Student vote results 
Student Vote Canada is a non-partisan program in Canada that holds mock elections in elementary and high schools alongside general elections (with the same candidates and same electoral system).

References

External links 
BC Stats
Results of 2001 election (pdf)
2001 Expenditures (pdf)
Results of 1996 election
1996 Expenditures
Results of 1991 election
1991 Expenditures
Website of the Legislative Assembly of British Columbia

Politics of Vancouver
British Columbia provincial electoral districts
Provincial electoral districts in Greater Vancouver and the Fraser Valley